Copelatus blancasi is a species of diving beetle. It is part of the genus Copelatus of the subfamily Copelatinae in the family Dytiscidae. It was described by Guignot in 1958.

References

blancasi
Beetles described in 1958